Unforgettable is a 2013 Philippine television drama romantic fantasy series broadcast by GMA Network. Directed by Gina Alajar, it stars Kylie Padilla. It premiered on February 25, 2013 on the network's Afternoon Prime line up replacing Yesterday's Bride. The series concluded on May 31, 2013 with a total of 67 episodes. It was replaced by Mga Basang Sisiw in its timeslot.

Cast and characters

Lead cast
 Kylie Padilla as Rosanna "Anna" Caruhatan

Supporting cast
 Mark Herras as Eduardo "Ed" Manalastas
 Benjamin Alves as Miguel de Ocampo 
 Pauleen Luna as Constance "Connie" de Ocampo
 Phillip Salvador as Manuel de Ocampo
 Polo Ravales as Arnold Regalado
 Glydel Mercado as Elvira Caruhatan
 Carmi Martin as Consuelo "Concha" de Ocampo
 Timmy Cruz as Raymunda "Munding" Manalastas

Recurring cast
 Chariz Solomon as Ruth Natividad
 Roy Alvarez as Salvador "Badong" Leoncio
 Kevin Santos as Randy Legaspi
 Pancho Magno as Darwin Toledo
 Rocco Nacino as Terrence Rosario
 Bianca Umali as Julia Regalado
 Lenlen Frial as Elai
 Jana Trites as Isabel

Production and development
The series was created and developed by Agnes Gagelonia-Uligan. She began developing the series late 2012. The series is part of the four new shows intended for the network's afternoon line up for the first quarter of 2013, alongside Forever, Bukod Kang Pinagpala, and Kakambal ni Eliana. The series, which slated for 16-week run (80 episodes), is under the direction of Gina Alajar while Darling Pulido-Torres served as the executive producer.

The majority of the cast was assembled in late January 2013. Lauren Young was the original choice of the network for the character of Anna Caruhatan, but was replaced by Kylie Padilla in the final casting. Mark Herras and Pauleen Luna, were hired for the roles of Ed Manalastas and Connie de Ocampo, respectively. Benjamin Alves was chosen to portray the character of Atty. Miguel de Ocampo. Alves described his role as "a dream come true," as he wanted to be a lawyer in real life. Glydel Mercado took the parental role of Elvira Caruhatan which was previously offered to Jean Garcia.

Salvador signed on to portray the series' antagonist Atty. Manuel de Ocampo. Meanwhile, Martin took the role of Concha de Ocampo, which was initially offered to Agot Isidro.

Ratings
According to AGB Nielsen Philippines' Mega Manila household television ratings, the pilot episode of Unforgettable earned a 16.5% rating. While the final episode scored a 14.1% rating.

References

External links
 

2013 Philippine television series debuts
2013 Philippine television series endings
Filipino-language television shows
GMA Network drama series
Philippine romance television series
Television shows set in the Philippines